Parabixadus brunneoplagiatus is a species of beetle in the family Cerambycidae, and the only species in the genus Parabixadus. It was described by Breuning in 1935.

References

Lamiini
Beetles described in 1935